Cristina Laslo (born 10 April 1996) is a Romanian professional handballer who plays as a centre back for Gloria Bistrița
and the Romanian national team.

International honours 
IHF Youth World Championship:
Gold Medalist: 2014
IHF Junior World Championship:
Bronze Medalist: 2016

Awards and recognition
All-Star Central Back of the IHF Youth World Championship: 2014
All-Star Central Back of the IHF Junior World Championship: 2016
Liga Națională Best Romanian Player: 2021

References

External links

 

1996 births
Living people
Sportspeople from Cluj-Napoca
Romanian female handball players
Expatriate handball players
Romanian expatriate sportspeople in Montenegro
CS Minaur Baia Mare (women's handball) players